
Gmina Stare Kurowo is a rural gmina (administrative district) in Strzelce-Drezdenko County, Lubusz Voivodeship, in western Poland.

Villages
Gmina Stare Kurowo contains the villages and settlements of Błotnica, Głęboczek, Kawki, Łącznica, Łęgowo, Nowe Kurowo, Pławin, Przynotecko, Rokitno, Smolarz and Stare Kurowo.

Neighbouring gminas
Gmina Stare Kurowo is bordered by the gminas of Dobiegniew, Drezdenko, Strzelce Krajeńskie and Zwierzyn.

References

Stare Kurowo
Strzelce-Drezdenko County